Rose maple is a common name for several flowering plants in the family Lauraceae, in a different family and order from true maples, and may refer to:

Cryptocarya erythroxylon
Cryptocarya rigida